The Order "For Naval Merit" is a state decoration of the Russian Federation bestowed for excellence in military or economic maritime endeavours. It was established on February 27, 2002 by Decree of the President of the Russian Federation № 245.  Its statute was amended by presidential decree № 1099 of September 7, 2010.

Award statute
The Order "For Naval Merit" is awarded to citizens of the Russian Federation: for achievements in the exploration, development and use of the oceans in the interest of national defence and for ensuring its economic and social development; for achievements in the development and implementation of the latest technology and equipment for the Russian Navy; for services in maintaining, expanding, researching and using the exclusive oceanic economic zone of the Russian Federation; for achievements in the fight against illegal actions of pirates and poachers aimed at causing environmental and economic damage likely to ill affect the reputation and interests of the Russian Federation in its exclusive oceanic economic zone, as well as attacks against ships flying the national flag of the Russian Federation on the oceans; for skillful organization and conduct of naval exercises and manoeuvres, during which all goals were fully achieved.

The Order "For Naval Merit" is worn on the left side of the chest and when worn in the presence of other medals and Orders of the Russian Federation, it is located immediately after the Order "For Military Merit".

Award description
The badge of the Order is in the shape of a 40 mm wide four pointed cross made of enamelled silver.  Two anchors cross behind a central medallion bearing the coat of arms of the Russian Federation.  The central medallion edge is enamelled in blue and bears the inscription "FOR NAVAL MERIT".

The Order "For Naval Merit" is suspended by a ring through the badge's suspension loop to a standard Russian pentagonal mount covered by an overlapping 24 mm wide white silk moiré ribbon with three central 2 mm wide longitudinal blue stripes separated by 3 mm.

Notable recipients (partial list)

The individuals listed below were recipients of the Order "For Naval Merit".

 Nikolay Aibulatov, Head of the Laboratory of the Institute of Oceanology of the Russian Academy of Sciences, Moscow
 Gennadiy Antokhin, icebreaker captain, Far East Shipping Company
 Sergei Avakyants, Admiral, Russian Federation Navy
 Valentin Avilov, Deputy General Director - Director of military equipment production of the Northern Machine Building Enterprise
 Arnold Bogdanovich Budretsky, leading expert of the Russian Antarctic Expedition of the Arctic and Antarctic Research Institute
 Vladimir Chernavin, Fleet Admiral, the last Commander-in-Chief of the Soviet Navy
 Artur Chilingarov, Polar explorer
 Viktor Chirkov, Commander of the Baltic Fleet, Commander-in-Chief of the Russian Navy
 Andrei A. Dyachkov, Director General Rubin Design Bureau
 Mikhail Izrailevich Genin, Chief Engineer and head of the  naval repair yards, Arkhangelsk Oblast
 Stuart Gold, Royal Navy, (UK)
 Oleg G. Gurinov, Captain 1st Rank, Russian Federation Navy
 Peter Hattell, Royal Navy, (UK)
 Mikhail Sergeyevich Kaloshin, Captain of the scientific vessel Akademik Fyodorov of the Arctic and Antarctic Research Institute
 Gennady Kolomna, Captain of the training vessel Kruzenshtern of the 
 Viktor Lapshin, Captain 2nd Rank, Russian Federation Navy
 Valery Lukin, Deputy Director of the Arctic and Antarctic Research Institute - head of the Russian Antarctic Expedition
 Nikolai Maksimov, Admiral, Russian Federation Navy
 Gennady G. Matishov, Academician and Director of the 
 Yuri Ivanovich Matveev, Director of the Federal State Research and Production Enterprise for marine geological exploration "Sevmorgeo"
 Aleksandr Nosatov, Admiral, Russian Federation Navy
 Igor Osipov, Vice-Admiral, Russian Federation Navy
 Ivan V. Polozhiy, Rear-Admiral, Russian Federation Navy
 Ian Riches, Commander, Royal Navy (UK) 
 Viktor Yagubov, head of the polar marine section of the Federal Service for Hydrometeorology and Environmental Monitoring
 Nikolay Kuzmich Zorchenko, Captain of the training vessel Pallada of the

See also
 Awards and decorations of the Russian Federation

References

External links
The Commission on State Awards to the President of the Russian Federation
Web site of the President of the Russian Federation
The Russian Gazette

Civil awards and decorations of Russia
Military awards and decorations of Russia
Orders, decorations, and medals of Russia
Russian awards
Awards established in 2002
2002 establishments in Russia